The 1991 UK Championship was a professional ranking snooker tournament that took place between 23 November and 1 December 1991 at the Guild Hall in Preston, England. The televised stages were shown on BBC.

The highest break of the televised stages was 142 made by Martin Clark and the same for the non-televised stages was 137 made by Mark Bennett.

John Parrott won his first and only UK Championship by defeating Jimmy White 16–13 in the final.

Prize fund 
The breakdown of prize money for this year is shown below:

Main draw

Final

Century breaks
All rounds

 142, 100  Martin Clark
 139, 118, 100  Drew Henry
 138, 117  Mark Boyd
 138, 106, 101  Neal Foulds
 137  Mark Bennett
 137  John Parrott
 136, 107  Jeff Cundy
 136  Gary Baldrey
 136  Nigel Bond
 134, 115, 102  Paul Dawkins
 134  Mark Davis
 134  Kevin Young
 133  Darren Hackeson
 132  Dave Harold
 130, 110  Stephen Hendry
 129  Anthony Hamilton
 127  Lee Richardson
 126  Oliver King
 126  Alain Robidoux
 125  Peter Lines
 124, 105  Wayne Jones
 123, 122  Joe Swail
 123, 119, 107  Fergal O'Brien
 123, 117, 109, 103  James Wattana
 123, 117, 101  Tony Drago
 123  Ken Doherty
 122, 105  Nick Terry
 122, 105  Bjorn L'Orange
 122  Mehmet Husnu
 120  David Taylor
 119  Allison Fisher

 119  Mike Hallett
 119  Robert Harrhy
 118  Dene O'Kane
 117  Troy Shaw
 117  Jimmy White
 115  Bradley Jones
 115  Gary Lees
 113  Paul Davies
 112, 108, 107  Willie Thorne
 111  Eugene Hughes
 111  Peter Daubney
 110  Stuart Reardon
 109  Tony Meo
 109  John Read
 108  David McDonnell
 107  Bob Chaperon
 106  Brian Cassidy
 106  Dean Reynolds
 105, 102, 101  Steve James
 105  Peter Bardsley
 105  Colin Morton
 105  Adrian Rosa
 105  Paul Webb
 104  David Grimwood
 103, 102  Tony Jones
 103  Anthony Davies
 103  Terry Griffiths
 101  Julian Goodyear
 100  Sean Lanigan
 100  Michael Stocks

References

1991
UK Championship
UK Championship
UK Championship
UK Championship